Individuals and events related to 2023 in Turkey.

Incumbents 
 President: Recep Tayyip Erdoğan
 29th Speaker of the Grand National Assembly: Mustafa Şentop
 President of the Constitutional Court: Zühtü Arslan
 Chief of the Turkish General Staff of the Armed Forces: Yaşar Güler
 Government: 66th government of Turkey
 Cabinet: Fourth Erdoğan Cabinet

Events

Ongoing 
 2016–present purges in Turkey

January 
 2 January - With the decision of the Council of State by a majority vote, Turkey's decision to withdraw from the Istanbul Convention became final.
 3 January - A cooperation agreement in the field of natural gas was signed between Turkey and Bulgaria.
 5 January
 A Turkish coast guard vessel exchanges warning shots with a Greek coast guard vessel near the Greek island of Farmakonisi.
 The Constitutional Court decided to block HDP's treasury aid account.
 7 January - Five people are killed and 23 others are injured in a bus crash in Diyarbakır.
 13 January - Rami Library is put into service.
 21 January - The Turkish defense ministry cancels Swedish defense minister Pål Jonson's upcoming visit to Turkey in response to an approval for far-right extremist Rasmus Paludan to protest in front of the Turkish embassy in Stockholm.
 30 January - The Nation Alliance announced the Common Policies Memorandum of Understanding, which includes its actions after the general election.

February 
 2 February - The Netherlands, Germany, the UK, France, Belgium, Sweden, Italy and Switzerland closed their consulates in Istanbul for security reasons.
 5 February - At least eight people are killed and 42 injured when a bus crashes and overturns in Afyonkarahisar Province.
 6 February - 2023 Turkey–Syria earthquake
 7 February - A state of emergency was declared for 3 months in 10 provinces due to the earthquake.
 9 February - Three inmates are killed and 12 more injured after soldiers open fire during a prison riot in Hatay Province. The prisoners were demanding to see their families affected by the recent earthquake.
 17 February - A Syrian family of seven, including five children, are killed by a fire that struck a home in Nurdağı, Gaziantep Province, which they moved to after surviving the earthquake. Seven other people are injured during the fire.
 20 February - A magnitude 6.4 earthquake struck in southern Turkey and is also felt in Syria, Lebanon and Egypt.
 27 February - One person is killed and 69 others are injured during a magnitude 5.6 earthquake in Yeşilyurt, Malatya.

Predicted and scheduled 
14 May - 2023 Turkish general election

Deaths

February
6 February: (in the 2023 Turkey–Syria earthquake)
 Cemal Kütahya, 32, handball player
 Yakup Taş, 63, politician, MP (since 2018)
 Ahmet Eyüp Türkaslan, 28, footballer (Osmanlıspor, Ümraniyespor, Yeni Malatyaspor)
 Zilan Tigris, 50, singer
 Nilay Aydogan, 30, basketball player
9 February – Sıtkı Güvenç, 61, politician, MP (2011–2015)
11 February – Deniz Baykal, 84, politician and former CHP leader

See also
 Outline of Turkey
 Index of Turkey-related articles
 List of Turkey-related topics
 History of Turkey

References

Notes

Citations

 
Turkey
Turkey
Turkey
2020s in Turkey
Years of the 21st century in Turkey